Senator Gant may refer to:

Jason Gant (born 1976), South Dakota State Senate
Mary Gant (born 1936), Missouri State Senate